Parkash Singh Badal's fifth cabinet started from March 2017. ingh is the leader of SAD was sworn in the Chief Ministers of Punjab on 2012. following is the list of ministers with their Government of Punjab.

Council of Ministers 

 As of March 2012

By Minister

By departments
An alphabetical list of all the departments of Punjab Government with terms :

References

2012 in Indian politics
Badal 05
2010s in Punjab, India
2012 establishments in Punjab, India
2017 disestablishments in India
Cabinets established in 2012
Cabinets disestablished in 2017
Shiromani Akali Dal ministries